Fair Oaks Mall is a shopping mall in the Fair Oaks census-designated place (CDP) of unincorporated Fairfax County, Virginia, just northwest of the independent city of Fairfax. It is located at the intersection of Interstate 66 and U.S. Route 50. The anchor stores are Dave & Buster's, Macy's, JCPenney, Macy's Furniture Gallery, and a combination of Dick's Sporting Goods and Golf Galaxy.

In August 2007 it was announced by Taubman Centers that preliminary plans were in the works to expand the mall by 34%.

From 2013 through 2014 Fair Oaks Mall underwent a renovation of the common areas of the mall.  The five entrances to the mall were completely renovated, and a grand entrance was built on the north side of the mall along Route 50.  The interior was updated with new floor tile, seating areas, technology tables, lighting, furniture, Michael & Son Fun Zone and customer service desk.

In March 2019 the restaurant and entertainment facility Dave & Buster's opened, bringing the total sit-down restaurants offered to seven, including Cheesecake Factory, Brio Tuscan Grille, Texas de Brazil, On the Border, Breakers Korean BBQ & Grill (upcoming), and Sushi On. In 2020, a Lazy Dog Restaurant & Bar opened next to the Dave & Buster's.

History
Fair Oaks Mall officially opened on July 31, 1980.  The  mall, developed by the Taubman Company, opened in the midst of a recession, with only four of six anchor stores in operation (Hecht's, JCPenney, Sears, and Woodward & Lothrop) and 15 other storefronts occupied, leaving three fourths of the storefronts empty. The two remaining anchors opened shortly after: in-line junior anchor Garfinckel's on August 21, 1980, and Lord & Taylor in spring 1981. Developers expected 60 to be occupied by the Christmas season and 100 by the following year. Upon opening, it was the largest mall in the Washington, D.C., area. It included the first suburban Washington location of the British homegoods store Conran's.

In 1982, the Fair Oaks Mall was one of the first sites used by Sears as part of its effort to offer financial services to customers, including stocks, bonds, insurance and real estate, from its Dean Witter, Allstate and Coldwell Banker subsidiaries.

In 1987, the mall's owners attempted to evict Garfinckel's and a related company, Raleigh Stores Holding, Inc., claiming that the store owners had not received the landlord's permission to assign the lease after Allied Stores divested some lines of business. The Garfinckel's chain went out of business in 1990, and Woodward & Lothrop used the space as an auxiliary store for home furnishings. After Woodward & Lothrop went out of business, their furniture store became a Mastercraft furniture store, and then Forever 21 in 2008. In 1998, Lord & Taylor moved from its original location to the old Woodward & Lothrop store. The old Lord & Taylor was converted to the mall's first Macy's.

In 1988, seeking to reach out to a broader range of patrons, the Fairfax library system opened a 10,000-volume branch at the Fair Oaks Mall. The mall also contains a Virginia DMV customer service center.

Fairfax Corner, a planned lifestyle center, opened in 2004 just south of Fair Oaks.

The late 2010's saw multiple classic chain anchors retreat from brick and mortar after being disrupted by digital retailers in recent years.

In August 2018, it was announced Sears would shutter and be reconstructed into additional mall space which includes Dave & Buster's, Lazy Dog Restaurant & Bar, Dick's Sporting Goods as well as a Golf Galaxy.

On August 27, 2020, it was announced that the Lord & Taylor location at the mall would be closing.

References

External links 

Fair Oaks Mall

Taubman Centers
Shopping malls in Virginia
Economy of Fairfax County, Virginia
Shopping malls established in 1980
1980 establishments in Virginia
Shopping malls in the Washington metropolitan area